Tobi 7 - Coptic Calendar - Tobi 9

The eighth day of the Coptic month of Tobi, the fifth month of the Coptic year. On a common year, this day corresponds to January 3, of the Julian Calendar, and January 16, of the Gregorian Calendar. This day falls in the Coptic season of Peret, the season of emergence.

Commemorations

Saints 

 The departure of Pope Andronicus, the 37th Patriarch of the See of Saint Mark 
 The departure of Pope Benjamin I, the 38th Patriarch of the See of Saint Mark 
 The departure of Pope Gabriel V, the 88th Patriarch of the See of Saint Mark

Other commemorations 

 The return of the Head of Saint Mark the Apostle 

 The consecrations of the Church of Saint Macarius the Great

References 

Days of the Coptic calendar